Ardrossan Academicals is a rugby union team from Ardrossan, North Ayrshire. The team's home ground is Memorial Field, across the road from Ardrossan Academy.

History

Two previous rugby union sides started in Ardrossan in 1870. The Ardrossan Castle Foot-Ball Club began playing at the practice ground at Clutha Park before moving to the Castle grounds. Its local rival was the Ardrossan Football Club that played on the Clutha Park practice ground. The Ardrossan Football Club was rugby union until it made the switch to association football in 1874; but only lasted another two years as an association side. The Ardrossan Castle Foot-Ball Club remained rugby union until around 1880. It switched to association football, dropping the hyphen in its name on making the switch.

The present club was founded in 1921.

In 2005, they won the BT Bowl by beating Greenock.

Ardrossan Sevens

The club run the Ardossan Sevens tournament. The men's competition began in 1954 and sides play for the Past Players Trophy. A woman's competition was started in 2016.

Honours
Ardrossan Sevens
 Champions: 1954, 1955, 1960, 1961, 1976
Cambuslang Sevens
 Champions: 1979
Wigtownshire Sevens
 Champions: 1975
Stirling Sevens
 Champions: 1972

Notable former players

Glasgow District
The following former Ardrossan Academicals players have represented Glasgow District at provincial level.

References

 Massie, Allan A Portrait of Scottish Rugby (Polygon, Edinburgh)

Scottish rugby union teams
Rugby union in North Ayrshire
Ardrossan−Saltcoats−Stevenston
1921 establishments in Scotland
Rugby clubs established in 1921